Behold a Pale Horse may refer to:

 "Behold a pale horse", a phrase taken from the biblical Book of Revelation
 Behold a Pale Horse (film), a 1964 film directed by Fred Zinnemann
 Behold! A Pale Horse, a 2009 album by The Ghost and the Grace
 Behold a Pale Horse, a 1991 book by Milton William Cooper
 "Behold a Pale Horse", a song from the Halo 3 Original Soundtrack
 "Behold a Pale Horse", a song by Angels & Airwaves from the album Love: Part Two
 "Behold a Pale Horse", a song by Boogiemonsters from the album God Sound

See also 
 Pale horse (disambiguation)